The red-chested goshawk (Accipiter toussenelii) is a medium-size hawk of West Africa. It is often considered conspecific with the African goshawk.

Range and habitat
It may be divided into two subspecies groups: the eastern (A. t. toussenelii and A. t. canescens), found from the Congo Basin west to Gabon and southern Cameroon, and the western (A. t. macroscelides and A. t. lopezi), found on Bioko and from western Cameroon west to Senegal. It inhabits low-altitude forests, especially rainforests and dense second growth, often near rivers and swamps, including mangroves. It can also occur in plantations, parks, and big gardens. Apparently it does not migrate or wander except possibly for dispersal of young.

The range of the species overlaps with the range of the African goshawk in western Uganda and the eastern and southern Democratic Republic of the Congo.

Description
The wingspan is 18.4 to 20.3 cm (7.2 to 8.0 inches) in males and 20.4 to 24.3 cm (8.0 to 9.6 inches) in females. The body length is about 3/5 of the wingspan. There is a pronounced size difference between males weighing 150 to 235 grams and females weighing 170 to 265 grams. The eyes, cere, and legs of adults are yellow to yellow-orange. In the eastern subspecies, adults have dark gray upperparts with lighter heads. The underparts are plain rufous and white. The tail is blackish with two or three big white patches. Juveniles are more or less unmarked blackish above and white below.

In the western subspecies, adults are also dark above, but have a grayish throat and barring mixed with rufous on the underparts. They have three white patches on the tail. Juveniles are blackish-brown above and white with heavy brown spotting below.

The most common call is a "ventriloquial rasping krit or sharper whit" given regularly every 2 or 3 seconds. It is given when the bird is perched, especially at dawn, and in flight, and is used as a contact call between mates, in courtship, and for territorial advertising.  The male gives a "quieter tchuck or krit" when bringing food to the nest. Other softer, less harsh calls are heard around the nest, maybe particularly from the female.

Reproduction
The breeding season begins in July or August and ends in February. Unlike the African goshawk, this species is said to perform flight displays only rarely. The nest is placed 6 to 20 meters above the ground in the main fork or on a side branch of a large tree, hidden by leaves or vines. It is built of sticks, 40 to cm across and 15 to 45 cm deep, with a lining of fresh leaves. The female lays 2 or 3 eggs (less often 1 or 4). As in most Accipitridae, the female incubates and cares for the young while the male supplies the food, with the female doing some of the hunting after the young are half-grown. Incubation lasts some 4 or 5 weeks, and the young fledge in 32 to 36 days. Juveniles probably molt directly into adult plumage when a little over one year old.

Feeding
This species' main foods are frogs and freshwater crabs. It takes large insects more regularly than the African goshawk, and also eats lizards, earthworms, and small mammals and birds. It hunts throughout the day, including dawn and dusk. Among its methods is waiting hidden in the forest canopy, often near an open space such as a trail or a body of water. It also flies quickly from tree to tree looking for prey that it can swoop down on or snatch, and flies beside lines of dense vegetation to surprise prey by flying through.

Conservation status
This species is probably declining because of habitat loss but is fairly adaptable and is probably still common.

Classification
The two subspecies groups may be considered separate species, in which case the western one is called Accipiter macroscelides, the West African goshawk. More commonly, though, the present species is lumped with the African goshawk because the groups intergrade and vary widely within themselves and separated populations resemble each other. The red-chested goshawk is treated here as a separate species following the Handbook of the Birds of the World and other authorities.

Etymology
Des Murs and Verreaux named this species after Alphonse Toussenel in the hope of encouraging him to move toward serious studies of natural history.

References

red-chested goshawk
Birds of prey of Sub-Saharan Africa
red-chested goshawk